On February 20, 2023, the President of the United States, Joe Biden, made a visit to Kyiv, the capital of Ukraine, his first since the beginning of the 2022 Russian invasion of Ukraine. Out of security concerns, his travel plans had not been made public prior to his arrival, and only two journalists accompanied him, having been sworn to secrecy three days earlier.

The visit took place on the day Ukraine remembers the Heavenly Hundred, on the eve of a scheduled major speech by Russian President Vladimir Putin and four days ahead of the 1-year anniversary of the full-scale invasion. The trip lasted a total of 24 hours, the majority of which were taken by the long train rides. During the five hours of meetings in Kyiv, Biden announced another $500 million in military assistance to Ukraine.

Biden's visit received a mixed reaction in the United States, split primarily along political party lines. It was the first time in modern history that a sitting U.S. President has traveled to an active conflict zone not controlled by the American military, and was the closest a president had come to a combat zone since Abraham Lincoln during the American Civil War. The Pentagon and the Secret Service opposed the visit to Kyiv.

Background
On February 24, 2022, Russia began a full-scale invasion of Ukraine. Throughout the war, the United States had been the largest supporter of Ukraine, committing over US$27 billion in security assistance since the invasion began.

The Pentagon and the Secret Service opposed Biden visiting Kyiv, and there were rumors about a possible meeting near the Polish border or in Lviv, Western Ukraine. The visit also came during softening support for the U.S. supplying weapons to Ukraine, according to polls.

Visit to Ukraine
 
Amid great secrecy, at about 4am EST on February 19, 2023, Biden departed the White House and travelled to Joint Base Andrews for a flight to Rzeszów, Poland, with a refueling stop at Ramstein Air Base in Germany, on a Boeing C-32A with the call sign "SAM060". Upon arrival at Rzeszów and transfer by car to Przemyśl, Biden boarded an overnight train to Kyiv, the method by which many world leaders visited the capital since the beginning of the invasion. The Russian government was informed prior to Biden's visit. The train ride lasted nearly 10 hours. During Biden's five hours in Kyiv, he was transported in a black limousine rather than the usual armored presidential car.

During his visit, Biden met with Volodymyr Zelenskyy, the president of Ukraine, and Olena Zelenska, the First Lady of Ukraine. The White House stated the visit to an active warzone was unprecedented as the U.S. does not have a military presence in Ukraine, nor a significant diplomatic footprint in Kyiv. The visit was the first in modern history that a US leader has traveled into a war zone not under control of the US military.

Air-raid sirens blared in Kyiv while Biden and Zelenskyy were walking outside. The sirens were triggered by a Russian MiG, carrying a hypersonic missile, taking off in Belarus. There were no attacks on Kyiv during the visit.

The trip preceded a scheduled visit to Europe, but the White House released a schedule about four hours after Biden entered Ukraine indicating he was still in Washington and was leaving for Europe that night. The visit took place on the day Ukraine remembers the Heavenly Hundred, on the eve of a scheduled major speech by Russian President Vladimir Putin and four days ahead of the 1-year anniversary of the full-scale invasion by Russia. The US government believes that while Biden was in Ukraine, Russia conducted a test of an RS-28 Sarmat ICBM that failed. Russia gave the US advance notice of the test.

Biden's trip in Ukraine lasted a total of 24 hours, the majority of which were taken by the long train rides. Oleksandr Kamyshin, the CEO of Ukrainian Railways, said the company named the train "Rail Force One" and apologized for the delays caused to other passengers. After the visit, Biden returned to Poland where he had a meeting with the Bucharest Nine and held a speech in Warsaw. He also condemned Russia's backing away from the New START nuclear arms reduction treaty.

Joint press conference with Zelenskyy 
Biden held a joint press conference with Zelenskyy at Mariinskyi Palace, remarking that "One year later, Kyiv stands. And Ukraine stands. Democracy stands. The Americans stand with you, and the world stands with you."

Military aid announcement
Biden announced an additional military aid package for Ukraine, worth US$500 million and including ammunition for the HIMARS rocket launcher system.

Reactions

Domestic reactions

Media 
Luke Harding from The Guardian called the visit "arguably the most consequential made by any US president to a European country since the end of the Cold War." The Atlantic staff writer Anne Applebaum wrote that the visit was a message not only to Moscow, but to European leaders as well as defense ministries and industries: "the paradigm has shifted, and the story has changed. The old "normal" is not coming back."

Politicians 
Political scientist Eliot A. Cohen compared the symbolism of the trip to President John F. Kennedy or President Ronald Reagan at the Berlin Wall, and saw it as a gut punch to Putin, a leader "obsessed with strength". Republicans criticized Biden's travel to a war zone that does not have a considerable American military presence, saying that Biden would have been better off going to the Mexican border or East Palestine, Ohio, that was recently affected by toxic waste released by a crashed train. 

United States Republican Congressmen Andy Ogles, Marjorie Taylor Greene, and Matt Gaetz published statements on Twitter decrying the trip, while Democrats praised Biden's leadership and support of Ukraine. National Security Advisor Jake Sullivan said, "the visit today was an effort to show, and not just tell, that we will continue to stand strong." White House officials described the visit as "unprecedented in modern times", due to the regular attacks that the site of the visit was under.

Ukrainian residents and officials welcomed the visit as a historic moment and Zelenskyy said it "is an extremely important sign of support for all Ukrainians." Andriy Yermak, the Head of the Office of the President of Ukraine, said the visit also had strategic effect: "A lot of issues are being resolved and those that have been pending will be expedited".

International reactions
Former Russian President Dmitry Medvedev dismissed the visit as an effort to increase the "huge quantities" of weapons and money already sent to Ukraine. Many of Russia's military pundits reacted with anger or embarrassment.

Igor Girkin suggested "the grandfather" could have gone to the heavily contested Bakhmut area without any personal danger.

Journalist Sergey Mardan wrote that it was a "demonstrative humiliation of Russia." A collective of service members noted the irony of Biden setting foot in Kyiv before Putin.

Analysts as well as Polish President Andrzej Duda saw the trip as an important morale boost for the Ukrainian soldiers. After news of the visit broke, Japanese Prime Minister Fumio Kishida announced $5.5 billion in new financial and humanitarian aid to Ukraine.

Gallery

See also
 2022 visit by Nancy Pelosi to Taiwan
 2022 Joe Biden speech in Warsaw
 2022 visit by Volodymyr Zelenskyy to the United States
 2023 visit by Volodymyr Zelenskyy to the United Kingdom
 Iron diplomacy
 List of international presidential trips made by Joe Biden
 List of serving heads of state and government that have visited Ukraine during the 2022 Russian invasion of Ukraine

References

External links
 
 White House: Statement from President Joe Biden on travel to Kyiv, Ukraine

2023 in international relations
2023 in Ukraine
2023 in American politics
2020s in Kyiv
February 2023 events in Ukraine
Events affected by the 2022 Russian invasion of Ukraine
Ukraine
Volodymyr Zelenskyy
Ukraine–United States relations